Mariano Hood and Sebastián Prieto were the defending champions but they competed with different partners that year, Hood with Lucas Arnold and Prieto with Martín García.

García and Prieto lost in the first round to Juan Ignacio Chela and Nicolás Massú.

Arnold and Hood won in the final 7–5, 6–7(2–7), 6–4 against Federico Browne and Diego Veronelli.

Seeds

  Lucas Arnold /  Mariano Hood (champions)
  František Čermák /  Leoš Friedl (semifinals)
  Simon Aspelin /  Massimo Bertolini (first round)
  Martín García /  Sebastián Prieto (first round)

Draw

References
 ATP Buenos Aires Main Draw

ATP Buenos Aires
2004 ATP Tour
ATP